Steye is a genus of sea snails, marine gastropod mollusks in the family Pisaniidae.

Species
Species within the genus Steye include:
 Steye janasaraiarum Faber, 2004

References

 Faber M.J. 2004. Marine gastropods from the ABC Islands and other localities. 4. A new buccinoid genus and species (Gastropoda: Buccinoidea). Miscellanea Malacologica, 1(2): 47-49

Pisaniidae